The 72 class was a class of diesel locomotive built by Chullora Railway Workshops for the New South Wales, Australia, Department of Railways in 1965.

Construction

Locomotive 7201 was a diesel-hydraulic locomotive, with B-B wheel arrangement. Built in the Department of Railways Water Supply Workshops at Chullora, it performed its first light engine trial on 27 August 1965. It was built on the lengthened underframe of an unused 58 class locomotive tender, but using the bogies from a Standard Goods locomotive turret tender. The cab was similar to that of an X200 class and the livery was similar to a 48 class.

The prime-mover was a Cummins VT 12-825-BI; V12 engine, developing 640 horsepower at 2,000 rpm. Power was distributed to the bogies through a Clark C 16911 torque converter with Clark 16421 transmission.

Operations
Following some modifications, it entered service on 8 September 1965 as a shunter at Cooks River Goods Yard. Over the next 6 months, it spent time shunting in yards at Goulburn, Junee, Broadmeadow and Werris Creek, and Port waratah. It even had a brief sojourn on the Yass Tramway. During this time, it re-entered the workshops for modifications and repairs. After this initial period, it spent extended periods at the Rozelle yards, however by 1970 it was regularly struggling with the loads. It was then trialed at the ACDEP carriage sheds where it shunted the carriages from air-conditioned trains. It was deemed a success in this duty and remained there until 2 March 1976 when it suffered a seized engine.

Demise
Being a one-off and therefore non-standard, the decision was made not to repair the locomotive. On 4 August 1976, it was condemned and scrapped in December that year.

References

Further reading

Bo-Bo locomotives
Diesel locomotives of New South Wales
Railway locomotives introduced in 1965
Standard gauge locomotives of Australia